In theoretical physics, soft SUSY breaking is type of  supersymmetry breaking that does not cause ultraviolet divergences to appear in scalar masses.

Overview
These terms are relevant operators—i.e. operators whose coefficients have a positive dimension of mass—though there are some exceptions.

A model with soft SUSY breaking was proposed in 1981 by Howard Georgi and Savas Dimopoulos.  Before this, dynamical models of supersymmetry breaking were being used that suffered from giving rise to color and charge breaking vacua.

Soft SUSY breaking decouples the origin of supersymmetry breaking from its phenomenological consequences.  In effect, soft SUSY breaking adds explicit symmetry breaking  to the supersymmetric Standard Model Lagrangian.  The source of SUSY breaking results from a different sector where supersymmetry is broken spontaneously.  Divorcing the spontaneous supersymmetry breaking from the supersymmetric Standard Model leads to the notion of mediated supersymmetry breaking.

Example operators

 Gaugino mass
 Scalar masses
 Scalar trilinear interactions ("A-terms")

Nonholomorphic Soft Supersymmetry Breaking Interactions
In low energy supersymmetry based models, the soft supersymmetry breaking interactions excepting the mass terms are usually considered to be holomorphic functions of fields. While a superpotential such as that of MSSM needs to be holomorphic, there is no reason why soft supersymmetry breaking interactions are required to be holomorphic functions of fields. Of course, an arbitrary nonholomorphic interaction may invite an appearance of quadratic divergence (or hard supersymmetry breaking); however, there are scenarios with no gauge singlet fields where nonholomorphic interactions can as well be of soft supersymmetry breaking type. Then, there exist nonholomorphic  -term contributions of the forms   that are soft supersymmetry breaking in nature. The above lead to nonholomorphic trilinear soft terms like  and an explicit Higgsino soft mass term like   in the Lagrangian. Away from MSSM,  there can be higgsino-gaugino interactions like  that are also nonholomorphic in nature.

References

Supersymmetric quantum field theory
Symmetry